Tamairangi  (fl. 1820–1828) was a notable New Zealand tribal leader and poet. Of Māori descent, she identified with the Ngati Ira and Ngati Kuia iwi. She was active from about 1820.

References

1828 deaths
New Zealand women poets
New Zealand Māori writers
Ngāti Kuia people
Year of birth unknown
19th-century women rulers